Georg Schors (18 October 1913 – 20 April 1997) was an Austrian footballer.

References

1913 births
1997 deaths
Austrian footballers
Association football forwards
ŠK Slovan Bratislava players
SK Rapid Wien players
Wiener Sport-Club players